Loire-les-Marais is a commune in the Charente-Maritime department in southwestern France.

Population

History
The now-retired adult actress Jade Laroche has a secondary house in Loire-Les-Marais where she filmed some of her movies.

See also
 Communes of the Charente-Maritime department

References

External links
 

Communes of Charente-Maritime